Impersonality may refer to:

 Impersonal passive voice, a verb voice that decreases the valency of an intransitive verb to zero
 Impersonal verb, a verb that cannot take a true subject